Orlandus Andre Branch (born July 14, 1989) is a former American football outside linebacker. He played college football at Clemson. He was selected by the Jacksonville Jaguars in the second round of the 2012 NFL Draft with the 38th overall pick.

College career
Branch attended Clemson University from 2007 to 2011. For his career he had 179 tackles and 17.5 sacks. As a senior in 2011, he was a first-team All-ACC pick after recording 77 tackles and 10.5 sacks.

Professional career

Jacksonville Jaguars
Branch was selected by the Jacksonville Jaguars in the second round of the 2012 NFL Draft with the 38th overall pick. On May 29, 2012, he signed a 4-year, $5.1 million contract.

Miami Dolphins
Branch signed with the Miami Dolphins in on March 17, 2016. In his first year in Miami, Branch started 11 of 16 games for the Dolphins, posting a career-high 49 tackles to go along with 5.5 sacks and two forced fumbles.

On March 8, 2017, Branch signed a three-year, $24 million contract extension with the Dolphins. He started 14 games in 2017, recording 23 combined tackles and 4.5 sacks.

Following a Week 1 game in 2018, Branch was fined $10,026 for taunting Taylor Lewan after delivering a concussion to Lewan with a blind side hit. 

On March 2, 2019, Branch was released by the Dolphins.

Arizona Cardinals
On July 30, 2019, Branch signed a one-year contract with the Arizona Cardinals after visiting earlier in June. He was released on August 25, 2019.

References

External links
 
 Miami Dolphins bio
 Jacksonville Jaguars bio
 

1989 births
Living people
Players of American football from Richmond, Virginia
American football defensive ends
Clemson Tigers football players
Jacksonville Jaguars players
Miami Dolphins players
Arizona Cardinals players